XHTGM-FM is a community radio station on 99.5 FM in Tangancícuaro, Michoacán. It is known as Radio Manantial.

History
XHTGM's concession was approved on December 13, 2017. The station signed on April 1, 2018. XHTGM had previously operated as a pirate on 105.1 MHz.

References

Radio stations in Michoacán
Community radio stations in Mexico
2018 establishments in Mexico
Radio stations established in 2018